Luperus longicornis is a skeletonizing leaf beetle belonging to the family Chrysomelidae, subfamily Galerucinae. The species was first described by Johan Christian Fabricius in 1781.

Distribution
This species can be found in the whole Palearctic realm and in the Near East.

Description
These beetles have black bodies and orange legs. The males generally have longer antennae than their female counterparts.

Biology
The larvae feed on grass roots and pass winter in the larval stage, as development is completed in the spring. Adults mainly feed on leaves of willows and birch (Salix species), but also on Rosaceae species and on foliage of several trees (Populus tremula, Quercus robur, etc.).

External links
 BioLib
 Fauna Europaea
 Culex.biol.uni.wroc.pl
 Thewcg

Galerucinae
Beetles of Europe
Beetles described in 1781
Taxa named by Johan Christian Fabricius